Zain Allen Retherford (born May 21, 1995) is an American freestyle wrestler and graduated folkstyle wrestler who competes at 65 kilograms. In freestyle, Retherford is a three-time US World Team Member. He was a silver medalist at the 2022 World Wrestling Championships, earning his first World medal at the highest level of the World Championships. Additionally, he helped Team USA reach third-place at the 2019 World Cup, going undefeated at 4–0, and winning the individual 2019 World Cup title. Retherford was also the 2012 Cadet World Champion at 63kg as a freestyle wrestler.

One of the greatest Penn State Nittany Lion wrestlers of all time, Retherford placed fifth at the 2014 NCAA Division I National Championships as a true freshman, and afterwards redshirted the following year. Subsequently, Retherford went 93–0 through his next three seasons of competition, winning three NCAA National championships, three Big Ten Conference championships and multiple high-importance awards, such as the Dan Hodge Trophy (twice), Big Ten Wrestler of the Year (twice) and NCAA Most Dominant Wrestler (twice), between others.

Early life 

Retherford was born in Washington, D.C., but moved to Benton, Pennsylvania, early in his life. He started high school at Line Mountain, where he won a state title as a freshman and took third place as a sophomore. He went on to compile a record of 84–3 before moving to Benton High School in his junior year. According to the PIAA the move was entirely  because of "athletic intent", however, Retherford claims there were other factors like bullying, health reasons and being closer to his father's business.

As a result of the move, Retherford was declared unable to compete that season (2011-12). Russ Hughes (his coach back then) states that it was in this time when Retherford started to really focus and grow as a wrestler. As a senior, he compiled an unbeaten record of 47–0 and collected his second state title. After the season, he became a Cadet World Champion in freestyle at 65-kilograms.

Retherford graduated from high school with a 131–3 record and two PIAA state titles.

College career 
As the #3 recruit in the country, Retherford committed to the Nittany Lions, at Penn State University.

2013-14 
Retherford had incredible success as a true freshman, going 27–0 in regular season. He made his way to the Big Ten Conference finals to face defending NCAA champion (eventual four-timer) Logan Stieber, whom he lost to by 4 points, making him the runner-up of the tournament. At the NCAA championships, Retherford defeated an unseeded opponent in the first round and also the eleventh and fourteenth seeds before losing to the second-seeded Logan Stieber once again. After losing in the semifinals, he faced and lost to top-seeded Mitchell Port in the consolation semis, ending his run at the tournament and placing fifth, which earned him All-American status.

2014-15 
In this season, Retherford chose to redshirt to focus on training and freestyle, placing second at the Junior World Team Trials and fourth at the 2015 Dave Schultz Memorial International.

2015-16 
As a sophomore, Retherford moved up to 149-pounds and closed the regular season undefeated with a 26–0 record before the Big Ten's. At the tournament, he defeated the eight and fifth seeds to make his way to the finale. where he downed second-seeded Brandon Sorensen to win the championship. At the NCAA's, he dominated with a technical fall (21-6) to start the tournament, accumulated 3 pins in a row and a major in the finals to close the tournament and claim his first NCAA title. He was named  the year's NCAA Most Dominant Wrestler, Penn State Male Athlete of the Year and Big Ten Wrestler of the Year.

2016-17 
In his junior year, he continued to establish dominance, staying in the top-spot of the division through the regular season. At the Big Ten Championships he downed four opponents with three falls and a technical fall (16-1) to become a two-time Big Ten Champion. At the NCAA Championships, he went 5–0 with four technical falls and a pin at the tournament to claim his second-straight NCAA Championship, making him the seventh Nittany Lion to do so. Due to his efforts, he was named the NCAA and Big Ten Championships Outstanding Wrestler. He ended the season with a 28–0 mark with seventeen pins, seven techs and a major, near to a 90 percent of bonus points in matches.

He then earned the Dan Hodge Trophy award as the most dominant wrestler in NCAA Division I and was named the year's NCAA Most Dominant Wrestler for the second time in a row.

2017-18 
As a senior, he remained unbeaten at 149-pounds with a 31–0 record. At the Big Ten's, he defeated three ranked wrestlers with two majors and one decision by points to claim his third-straight B1G Championship. At the NCAA Championships, he opened up with a tech (16-1) and a pin before another tech (20-2) in the quarterfinals. In his next two matches he won by decision  (10-4 and 6-2), claiming his third-straight NCAA title.

After the season, he became only the fourth person to be awarded the prestigious Dan Hodge Trophy twice. He was also named NCAA Most Dominant Wrestler for the third straight time and Big Ten Wrestler of the Year for the second time. In his four seasons at PSU, he graduated with a 128–4 record (all of his losses coming as a freshman).

Overall, Retherford is a two-time Dan Hodge Trophy winner, three-time NCAA Champion, four-time All-American, three-time Big Ten Champion and four-time Big Ten finalist.

Freestyle career 
As a cadet and a junior, Retherford already had prestigious freestyle accomplishments; Cadet World and National champion and three-time Junior National runner-up.

2015 
At the Dave Schultz Memorial, Retherford lost to Jordan Oliver in the quarterfinals (2-6). In the repechage matches, he made his way to the third place match by beating Evan Henderson (10-7), Borislav Novachkov (injury default) and Murad Nukhadiev (9-2). In the bronze-medal match, he faced Andrey Kviatkovski, whom he lost to (4-8), placing fourth in his first competition as a senior.

2016 
At the US Olympic Team Trials, Retherford defeated James Green (9-2) in the preliminary match and advanced to the quarterfinals, where he faced Logan Stieber, whom he lost to (6-8). In the repechage matches, he downed Jason Chamberlain (7-2), Jayson Ness (6-3) and Jimmy Kennedy (2-2) to place third in the tournament.

2017 
At the US Open, Retherford placed third after losing to Jordan Oliver in the semifinals, qualifying for the World Team Trials Tournament. He won the Challenge Tournament and went on to face Frank Molinaro at the wrestle-offs. He won the 2-out-of-3 matches, losing the first one (6-7) and dominantly winning the other two (6-0, 7-4).

Retherford competed at the Spain Grand Prix before the World Championships. He dominated his opponents, not getting scored a single point and winning all of his matches (4-0, TF 11–0, 6–0, TF 10-0).

At the World Championships, Retherford teched (10-0) David Habat in the opening match but subsequently lost to Adam Batirov (4-6), getting eliminated and placing eleventh.

2019 
At the Ivan Yarygin Golden Grand Prix, he lost in the opening bout to Gadzhimurad Rashidov (3-4) and got eliminated, placing eighth.

At the US Open, he downed 5 opponents before losing to Yianni Diakomihalis in the finals, this qualified him for the World Team Trials. At the Challenge Tournament, he defeated Dean Heil, Frank Molinaro and Jordan Oliver twice before competing at Final X: Rutgers against Yianni Diakomihalis. In the first match, Retherford beat Diakomihalis 10–4. The second match ended with a lot on controversy; Retherford was down 4-6 when he got a takedown for two points, Diakomihalis ended up earning two more to apparently win the match 8–6, however, there were problems with the scoring and that led to the match being scored 6–6 with an advantage on criteria to Retherford, winning the match and the Final X series.

He once again faced Yianni Diakomihalis in the qualification round of the Grand Prix Yaşar Doğu. He lost the match by points (9-5). He was then scheduled to compete at the Pan American Games, however, he was forced to pull out a week before the event and was replaced by Jaydin Eierman.

Due to the past controversy at Final X: Rutgers, Retherford faced Diakomihalis for the fifth time in their freestyle career in a wrestle-off called Final X: Yianni vs. Zain to determine who was going to represent the United States at the World Championships. He defeated Diakomihalis by two points to one.

Retherford competed at the World Championships weeks after his wrestle-off. He lost a close bout in the first round against Alejandro Valdés (9-10) and was eliminated, placing twenty-sixth.

Retherford competed at the Alan International in Russia. He downed Inar Kettia and Iulian Gergenov (TF 13–2, TF 11-0) prior to losing to Saiyn Kazyryk (4-6), placing seventh.

In his last tournament of 2019, he competed at the prestigious World Cup, where he ended up undefeated at 65 kilograms with four victories, claiming the individual World Cup championship and helping Team USA win the team bronze-medal.

2020 
In his first competition of the year, Retherford competed at the Matteo Pellicone RS. He faced Bajrang Punia, whom he lost a close decision (4-5) in the opening round. He went on to place third as he beat Joey McKenna (10-5) and pinned Vasyl Shuptar in the repechage matches.

In an attempt to make his way to the Olympics, Retherford competed at the Pan American Olympic Qualification Tournament. He started strong, winning by technical superiority (10-0) in both of his first two bouts. In the semifinals, he faced Agustín Destribats. Retherford took him down early, however, Destribats was able to adjust and worked his way to the victory by fall, being the first wrestler to get the win in that fashion against Retherford in freestyle competition. In the third-place match, he faced Álbaro Rudesindo, whom he pinned.

Retherford was scheduled to compete at the 2020 US Olympic Team Trials on April 4 at State College, Pennsylvania. However, the event was postponed for 2021 along with the Summer Olympics due to the COVID-19 pandemic, leaving all the qualifiers unable to compete.

After six months without being able to compete, Retherford returned to the mats against three–time NCAA Division I All-American Alec Pantaleo on September 19 at the NLWC I, whom he outscored 3 points to 2. He then won by technical fall  against three–time US National Champion and World Team Member Reece Humphrey on November 24, at the NLWC III. Retherford avenged his loss to Bajrang Punia at the Matteo Pellicone, when he flawlessly defeated him 6–0  at the NLWC IV of December 22.

2021 
To start off the year, Retherford defeated Evan Henderson in February at the NLWC V. Retherford competed at the rescheduled 2020 US Olympic Team Trials from April 2 to 3 as the top–seed in an attempt of representing the United States at the 2020 Summer Olympics. He knocked off two–time Pan American Continental champion and 2019 NCAA champion Anthony Ashnault in the first round, but was unexpectedly upset by 2018 US Open champion Joey McKenna by decision. He lost his consolation match against 2021 NCAA champion from Penn State Nick Lee, not placing.

Retherford bulked up to 70 kilograms for a comeback at the 2021 US World Team Trials on September 11–12, intending to represent the country at the World Championships. After losing in the first round in the hands of Jordan Oliver, Retherford made his way to a third-place finish. He is also a Senior Freestyle World Silver Medalist (70 kg; 2022).

Freestyle record 

! colspan="7"| Senior Freestyle Matches
|-
!  Res.
!  Record
!  Opponent
!  Score
!  Date
!  Event
!  Location
|-
! style=background:white colspan=7 |
|-
|Win
|63–16
|align=left| Syrbaz Talgat
|style="font-size:88%"|TF 10–0
|style="font-size:88%" rowspan=5|July 18, 2022
|style="font-size:88%" rowspan=5|2022 Zouhaier Sghaier Ranking Series
|style="text-align:left;font-size:88%;" rowspan=5| Tunis, Tunisia
|-
|Win
|62–16
|align=left| Kossai Ajimi
|style="font-size:88%"|TF 11–0
|-
|Win
|61–16
|align=left| Karan Karan
|style="font-size:88%"|Fall
|-
|Win
|
|align=left| Haydar Yavuz
|style="font-size:88%"|INJ
|-
|Win
|60–16
|align=left| Sanzhar Kozhanov
|style="font-size:88%"|Fall
|-
! style=background:white colspan=7 |
|-
|Win
|59–16
|align=left| Jordan Oliver
|style="font-size:88%"|4–3
|style="font-size:88%" rowspan=3|June 3, 2022
|style="font-size:88%" rowspan=3|2022 Final X: Stillwater
|style="text-align:left;font-size:88%;" rowspan=3|
 Stillwater, Oklahoma
|-
|Loss
|58–16
|align=left| Jordan Oliver
|style="font-size:88%"|4–5
|-
|Win
|58–15
|align=left| Jordan Oliver
|style="font-size:88%"|8–3
|-
|Win
|57–15
|align=left| Alec Pantaleo
|style="font-size:88%"|5–2
|style="font-size:88%" rowspan=2|May 21–22, 2022
|style="font-size:88%" rowspan=2|2022 US World Team Trials Challenge Tournament
|style="text-align:left;font-size:88%;" rowspan=2|
 Coralville, Iowa
|-
|Win
|56–15
|align=left| Doug Zapf
|style="font-size:88%"|4–1
|-
! style=background:white colspan=7 |
|-
|Win
|55–15
|align=left| Ramazan Ramazanov
|style="font-size:88%"|10–6
|style="font-size:88%" rowspan=4|February 17–20, 2022
|style="font-size:88%" rowspan=4|2022 Dan Kolov - Nikola Petrov International
|style="text-align:left;font-size:88%;" rowspan=4| Veliko Tarnovo, Bulgaria
|-
|Win
|54–15
|align=left| Yehor Muradyan
|style="font-size:88%"|Fall
|-
|Win
|53–15
|align=left| Marc Dietsche
|style="font-size:88%"|TF 12–2
|-
|Win
|52–15
|align=left| Ivan Stoyanov
|style="font-size:88%"|8–0
|-
! style=background:white colspan=7 |
|-
|Win
|51–15
|align=left| Tyler Berger
|style="font-size:88%"|TF 11–0
|style="font-size:88%" rowspan=4|September 11–12, 2021
|style="font-size:88%" rowspan=4|2021 US World Team Trials
|style="text-align:left;font-size:88%;" rowspan=4| Lincoln, Nebraska
|-
|Win
|
|align=left| Alec Pantaleo
|style="font-size:88%"|FF
|-
|Win
|50–15
|align=left| Jarrett Jacques
|style="font-size:88%"|TF 10–0
|-
|Loss
|49–15
|align=left| Jordan Oliver
|style="font-size:88%"|2–2
|-
! style=background:white colspan=7 |
|-
|Loss
|49–14
|align=left| Nick Lee
|style="font-size:88%"|4–10
|style="font-size:88%" rowspan=3|April 2, 2021
|style="font-size:88%" rowspan=3|2020 US Olympic Team Trials
|style="text-align:left;font-size:88%;" rowspan=3| Forth Worth, Texas
|-
|Loss
|49–13
|align=left| Joey McKenna
|style="font-size:88%"|5–8
|-
|Win
|49–12
|align=left| Anthony Ashnault
|style="font-size:88%"|5–1
|-
|Win
|48-12
|align=left| Evan Henderson
|style="font-size:88%"|6–2
|style="font-size:88%"|February 23, 2021
|style="font-size:88%"|NLWC V
|style="text-align:left;font-size:88%;" rowspan=4|
 State College, Pennsylvania
|-
|Win
|47-12
|align=left| Bajrang Punia
|style="font-size:88%"|6-0
|style="font-size:88%"|December 22, 2020
|style="font-size:88%"|NLWC IV
|-
|Win
|46-12
|align=left| Reece Humphrey
|style="font-size:88%"|TF 10-0
|style="font-size:88%"|November 24, 2020
|style="font-size:88%"|NLWC III
|-
|Win
|45-12
|align=left| Alec Pantaleo
|style="font-size:88%"|3-2
|style="font-size:88%"|September 19, 2020
|style="font-size:88%"|NLWC I
|-
! style=background:white colspan=7 | 
|-
|Win
|44-12
|align=left| Álbaro Rudesindo
|style="font-size:88%"|Fall
|style="font-size:88%" rowspan=4|March 15, 2020
|style="font-size:88%" rowspan=4|2020 Pan American Wrestling Olympic Qualification Tournament
|style="text-align:left;font-size:88%;" rowspan=4|
 Ottawa, Canada
|-
|Loss
|43-12
|align=left| Agustín Destribats
|style="font-size:88%"|Fall
|-
|Win
|43-11
|align=left| Wber Euclides Cuero Munoz
|style="font-size:88%"|TF 10-0
|-
|Win
|42-11
|align=left| Jose Rodriguez
|style="font-size:88%"|TF 10-0
|-
! style=background:white colspan=7 |
|-
|Win
|41-11
|align=left| Vasyl Shuptar
|style="font-size:88%"|Fall
|style="font-size:88%" rowspan=3|January 15–18, 2020
|style="font-size:88%" rowspan=3|2020 Matteo Pellicone Ranking Series
|style="text-align:left;font-size:88%;" rowspan=3| Rome, Italy
|-
|Win
|40-11
|align=left| Joey McKenna
|style="font-size:88%"|10-5
|-
|Loss
|39-11
|align=left| Bajrang Punia
|style="font-size:88%"|4-5
|-
! style=background:white colspan=7 |
|-
|Loss
|39-10
|align=left| Saiyn Kazyryk
|style="font-size:88%"|4-6
|style="font-size:88%" rowspan=3|December 7–9, 2019
|style="font-size:88%" rowspan=3|2019 Alans International Tournament
|style="text-align:left;font-size:88%;" rowspan=3| Vladikavkaz, Russia
|-
|Win
|39-9
|align=left| Iulian Gergenov
|style="font-size:88%"|TF 11-0
|-
|Win
|38-9
|align=left| Inar Ketiia
|style="font-size:88%"|TF 13-2
|-
! style=background:white colspan=7 |
|-
|Loss
|37-9
|align=left| Alejandro Valdés
|style="font-size:88%"|9-10
|style="font-size:88%"|September 14–22, 2019
|style="font-size:88%"|2019 World Wrestling Championships
|style="text-align:left;font-size:88%;"|
 Nur-Sultan, Kazakhstan
|-
! style=background:white colspan=7 |
|-
|Win
|37-8
|align=left| Yianni Diakomihalis
|style="font-size:88%"|2-1
|style="font-size:88%"|September 2, 2019
|style="font-size:88%"|2019 Final X Wrestle-Off: Yianni vs Zain
|style="text-align:left;font-size:88%;"|
 Wilkes-Barre, Pennsylvania
|-
! style=background:white colspan=7 |
|-
|Loss
|36-8
|align=left| Yianni Diakomihalis
|style="font-size:88%"|5-9
|style="font-size:88%"|July 11–14, 2019
|style="font-size:88%"|2019 Grand Prix Yaşar Doğu
|style="text-align:left;font-size:88%;"|
 Istanbul, Turkey
|-
|Win
|36-7
|align=left| Yianni Diakomihalis
|style="font-size:88%"|6-6
|style="font-size:88%" rowspan=2|June 7–8, 2019
|style="font-size:88%" rowspan=2|2019 Final X: Rutgers
|style="text-align:left;font-size:88%;" rowspan=2|
 New Brunswick, New Jersey
|-
|Win
|35-7
|align=left| Yianni Diakomihalis
|style="font-size:88%"|10-4
|-
|Win
|34-7
|align=left| Jordan Oliver
|style="font-size:88%"|7-6
|style="font-size:88%" rowspan=4| May 17–19, 2019 
|style="font-size:88%" rowspan=4| 2019 US World Team Trials Challenge Tournament
|style="text-align:left;font-size:88%;" rowspan=4|
 Raleigh, North Carolina
|-
|Win
|33-7
|align=left| Jordan Oliver
|style="font-size:88%"|7-6
|-
|Win
|32-7
|align=left| Frank Molinaro
|style="font-size:88%"|6-1
|-
|Win
|31-7
|align=left| Dean Heil
|style="font-size:88%"|TF 10-0
|-
! style=background:white colspan=7 | 
|-
|Loss
|30-7
|align=left| Yianni Diakomihalis
|style="font-size:88%"|4-6
|style="font-size:88%" rowspan=6|April 24–27, 2019 
|style="font-size:88%" rowspan=6|2019 US Open Wrestling Championships
|style="text-align:left;font-size:88%;" rowspan=6|
 Las Vegas, Nevada
|-
|Win
|30-6
|align=left| Jaydin Eierman 
|style="font-size:88%"|11-3
|-
|Win
|29-6
|align=left| Jayson Ness 
|style="font-size:88%"|TF 10-0
|-
|Win
|28-6
|align=left| Mitch McKee
|style="font-size:88%"|TF 10-0
|-
|Win
|27-6
|align=left| Tristan Moran
|style="font-size:88%"|TF 10-0
|-
|Win
|26-6
|align=left| Peter Lipari
|style="font-size:88%"|TF 10-0
|-
! style=background:white colspan=7 |
|-
|Win
|25-6
|align=left| Daichi Takatani
|style="font-size:88%"|TF 10-0
|style="font-size:88%" rowspan=4|March 16–17, 2019
|style="font-size:88%" rowspan=4|2019 Wrestling World Cup
|style="text-align:left;font-size:88%;" rowspan=4| Yakutsk, Russia
|-
|Win
|24-6
|align=left| Batmagnai Batchuluun
|style="font-size:88%"|TF 10-0
|-
|Win
|23-6
|align=left| Morteza Ghiasi
|style="font-size:88%"|6-1
|-
|Win
|22-6
|align=left| Amiran Vakhtangashvili
|style="font-size:88%"|9-2
|-
! style=background:white colspan=7 |
|-
|Loss
|21-6
|align=left| Gadzhimurad Rashidov
|style="font-size:88%"|3-4
|style="font-size:88%"|January 24–27, 2019
|style="font-size:88%"|Golden Grand Prix Ivan Yarygin 2019
|style="text-align:left;font-size:88%;"|
 Krasnoyarsk, Russia
|-
! style=background:white colspan=7 | 
|-
|Loss
|21-5
|align=left| Adam Batirov
|style="font-size:88%"|4-6
|style="font-size:88%" rowspan=2|August 21–27, 2017
|style="font-size:88%" rowspan=2|2017 World Wrestling Championships
|style="text-align:left;font-size:88%;" rowspan=2|
 Paris, France
|-
|Win
|21-4
|align=left| David Habat
|style="font-size:88%"|TF 10-0
|-
! style=background:white colspan=7 |
|-
|Win
|20-4
|align=left| Vahid Ahangari
|style="font-size:88%"|TF 10-0
|style="font-size:88%" rowspan=4|July 15–16, 2017
|style="font-size:88%" rowspan=4|2017 Grand Prix of Spain
|style="text-align:left;font-size:88%;" rowspan=4| Madrid, Spain
|-
|Win
|19-4
|align=left| Ilman Mukhtarov
|style="font-size:88%"|6-0
|-
|Win
|18-4
|align=left| Maxime Fiquet
|style="font-size:88%"|TF 11-0
|-
|Win
|17-4
|align=left| Gabriel Janatsch
|style="font-size:88%"|4-0
|-
! style=background:white colspan=7 |
|-
|Win
|16-4
|align=left| Frank Molinaro
|style="font-size:88%"|7-4
|style="font-size:88%" rowspan=3|June 10, 2017
|style="font-size:88%" rowspan=3|2017 US World Team Trials
|style="text-align:left;font-size:88%;" rowspan=6| Lincoln, Nebraska
|-
|Win
|15-4
|align=left| Frank Molinaro
|style="font-size:88%"|6-0
|-
|Loss
|14-4
|align=left| Frank Molinaro
|style="font-size:88%"|6–7
|-
|Win
|14-3
|align=left| Bernard Futrell
|style="font-size:88%"|TF 10-0
|style="font-size:88%" rowspan=3|June 9, 2017
|style="font-size:88%" rowspan=3|2017 US World Team Trials Challenge Tournament
|-
|Win
|13-3
|align=left| Nick Dardanes
|style="font-size:88%"|TF 11-0
|-
|Win
|12-3
|align=left| Jaydin Eierman
|style="font-size:88%"|TF 14-2
|-
! style=background:white colspan=7 | 
|-
|Win
|11-3
|align=left| Jimmy Kennedy
|style="font-size:88%"|4-3
|style="font-size:88%" rowspan=5|April 26–29, 2017
|style="font-size:88%" rowspan=5|2017 US Open Wrestling Championships
|style="text-align:left;font-size:88%;" rowspan=5|
 Las Vegas, Nevada
|-
|Win
|10-3
|align=left| Evan Henderson
|style="font-size:88%"|TF 10-0
|-
|NC
|9–3
|align=left| Jordan Oliver
|style="font-size:88%"|NC (overturned)
|-
|Win
|9-3
|align=left| Nick Dardanes
|style="font-size:88%"|TF 10-0
|-
|Win
|8-3
|align=left| Koby Reyes
|style="font-size:88%"|TF 10-0
|-
! style=background:white colspan=7 | 
|-
|Win
|7-3
|align=left| Jimmy Kennedy
|style="font-size:88%"|2-2
|style="font-size:88%" rowspan=5|April 9–10, 2016
|style="font-size:88%" rowspan=5|2016 US Olympic Team Trials
|style="text-align:left;font-size:88%;" rowspan=5|
 Iowa City, Iowa
|-
|Win
|6-3
|align=left| Jayson Ness
|style="font-size:88%"|6-3
|-
|Win
|5-3
|align=left| Jason Chamberlain
|style="font-size:88%"|7-2
|-
|Loss
|4-3
|align=left| Logan Stieber
|style="font-size:88%"|6-8
|-
|Win
|4-2
|align=left| James Green
|style="font-size:88%"|9-2
|-
! style=background:white colspan=7 | 
|-
|Loss
|3-2
|align=left| Andrey Kvyatkovskyy
|style="font-size:88%"|4-8
|style="font-size:88%" rowspan=5|January 29–31, 2015
|style="font-size:88%" rowspan=5|2015 Dave Schultz Memorial International
|style="text-align:left;font-size:88%;" rowspan=5|
 Colorado Springs, Colorado
|-
|Win
|3-1
|align=left| Murad Nukhadiev
|style="font-size:88%"|9-2
|-
|Win
|2-1
|align=left| Evan Henderson
|style="font-size:88%"|10-7
|-
|Loss
|1-1
|align=left| Jordan Oliver
|style="font-size:88%"|2-6
|-
|Win
|1-0
|align=left| Michael Mangrum
|style="font-size:88%"|7-6
|-

NCAA record 

! colspan="8"| NCAA Championships Matches
|-
!  Res.
!  Record
!  Opponent
!  Score
!  Date
!  Event
|-
! style=background:white colspan=6 |2018 NCAA Championships  at 149 lbs
|-
|Win
|18-2
|align=left|Ronald Perry
|style="font-size:88%"|6-2
|style="font-size:88%" rowspan=5|March 15–17, 2018
|style="font-size:88%" rowspan=5|2018 NCAA Division I Wrestling Championships
|-
|Win
|17-2
|align=left|Troy Heilmann
|style="font-size:88%"|10-4
|-
|Win
|16-2
|align=left|Boo Lewallen
|style="font-size:88%"|TF 20-2
|-
|Win
|15-2
|align=left|Alfred Bannister
|style="font-size:88%"|Fall
|-
|Win
|14-2
|align=left|Kyle Springer
|style="font-size:88%"|TF 16-1
|-
! style=background:white colspan=6 |2017 NCAA Championships  at 149 lbs
|-
|Win
|13–2
|align=left|Lavion Mayes
|style="font-size:88%"|TF 18-2
|style="font-size:88%" rowspan=5|March 16–18, 2017
|style="font-size:88%" rowspan=5|2017 NCAA Division I Wrestling Championships
|-
|Win
|13–2
|align=left|Brandon Sorensen
|style="font-size:88%"|Fall
|-
|Win
|12–2
|align=left|Alex Kocer
|style="font-size:88%"|TF 19-2
|-
|Win
|11–2
|align=left|Jordan Laster
|style="font-size:88%"|TF 16-0
|-
|Win
|10–2
|align=left|Joshua Maruca
|style="font-size:88%"|TF 19-2
|-
! style=background:white colspan=6 |2016 NCAA Championships  at 149 lbs
|-
|Win
|9–2
|align=left|Brandon Sorensen
|style="font-size:88%"|MD 10-1
|style="font-size:88%" rowspan=5|March 17–19, 2016
|style="font-size:88%" rowspan=5|2016 NCAA Division I Wrestling Championships
|-
|Win
|8-2
|align=left|Alec Pantaleo
|style="font-size:88%"|Fall
|-
|Win
|7-2
|align=left|Justin Oliver
|style="font-size:88%"|Fall
|-
|Win
|5-2
|align=left|Pat Lugo
|style="font-size:88%"|Fall
|-
|Win
|4-2
|align=left|Coleman Hammond
|style="font-size:88%"|TF 21-6
|-
! style=background:white colspan=6 |2014 NCAA Championships 5th at 141 lbs
|-
|Loss
|3-2
|align=left|Mitchell Port
|style="font-size:88%"|TB 1-3
|style="font-size:88%" rowspan=5|March 21, 2014
|style="font-size:88%" rowspan=5|2014 NCAA Division I Wrestling Championships
|-
|Loss
|3-1
|align=left|Logan Stieber
|style="font-size:88%"|3-7
|-
|Win
|3–0
|align=left|Joey Lazor
|style="font-size:88%"|5-2
|-
|Win
|2–0
|align=left|Edgar Bright
|style="font-size:88%"|3-0
|-
|Win
|1–0
|align=left|Ugi Khishignyam 
|style="font-size:88%"|5-0
|-

Stats 

!  Season
!  Year
!  School
!  Rank
!  Weigh Class
!  Record
!  Win
!  Bonus
|-
|2018
|Senior
|rowspan=4|Penn State University
|#1 (1st)
|rowspan=3|149
|31-0
|100.00%
|83.87%
|-
|2017
|Junior
|#1 (1st)
|28-0
|100.00%
|89.29%
|-
|2016
|Sophomore
|#1 (1st)
|34-0
|100.00%
|88.57%
|-
|2014
|Freshman
|#4 (5th)
|141
|33-3
|89.47%
|39.47%
|-
|colspan=5 bgcolor="LIGHTGREY"|Career
|bgcolor="LIGHTGREY"|126-3
|bgcolor="LIGHTGREY"|96.37%
|bgcolor="LIGHTGREY"|75.30%

Awards and honors 

2020
 Pan American Wrestling Olympic Qualification (65 kg)
 Matteo Pellicone Ranking Series (65 kg)
2019
 World Cup (65 kg)
 US World Team Trials (65 kg)
 U.S Open Championship (65 kg)
2018
 NCAA Division I (149 lbs)
 Big Ten Conference (149 lbs)
Dan Hodge Trophy winner
NCAA Most Dominant wrestler
Big Ten Wrestler of the Year
2017
 US World Team Trials (65 kg)
 U.S Open Championship (65 kg)
 Spain Grand Prix
 NCAA Division I (149 lbs)
 Big Ten Conference (149 lbs)
Dan Hodge Trophy winner
NCAA Division I Championships Outstanding Wrestler
NCAA Most Dominant wrestler
Big Ten Championships Outstanding Wrestler
2016
 US Olympic Team Trials Challenge Tournament (65 kg)
 NCAA Division I (149 lbs)
 Big Ten Conference (149 lbs)
NCAA Most Dominant wrestler
Penn State Male Athlete of the Year
Big Ten Wrestler of the Year
2014
NCAA Division I All-American (141 lbs)
 Big Ten Conference (141 lbs)

See also 

 United States results in men's freestyle wrestling

References

External links 
 
 

1995 births
Living people
Sportspeople from Washington, D.C.
American male sport wrestlers
World Wrestling Championships medalists